Thomas Hamilton Oliver Jennings (8 March 1902 – 1973) was a Scottish footballer.

Career
Jennings started his career with Cadzow St Anne's and had a trial with Tottenham Hotspur in 1919, playing no games for the club. He then moved on to Raith Rovers, before joining Leeds United in March 1925. He made 167 league appearances for the club, in which he scored 112 goals, before he joined Chester in June 1931. He made 48 league appearances and scored 33 goals and in 1933 joined Bangor City.

Jennings officially scored Chester's first ever Football League goal in a 1–1 draw with Wrexham on 2 September 1931. Although Chester had beaten Wigan Borough 4-0 four days earlier (with Jennings scoring the third goal), the result was deleted after Wigan resigned from the Football League in October 1931.

Later in the season he scored Chester's first Football League hat-trick, when he scored all the club's goals in a 5–1 win over Walsall in January 1932. His tally of five goals in one game has only been matched once (by Barry Jepson in 1958) and never bettered by a Chester player in a Football League fixture. Jennings also scored four times in a 7–2 win over Rochdale in April 1932 and comfortably ended the season as Chester's top scorer, with 30 league goals to his name. But he only played nine more league games for the club after this and moved on.

Jennings later managed Bangor City and Third Lanark.

References 

1902 births
People from Strathaven
1973 deaths
Scottish footballers
Association football forwards
Tottenham Hotspur F.C. players
Leeds United F.C. players
Chester City F.C. players
Bangor City F.C. players
English Football League players
Scottish football managers
Bangor City F.C. managers
Third Lanark A.C. managers
Footballers from South Lanarkshire
Scottish Football League managers